The Unknown Lover is a 1925 American silent drama film produced and directed by Victor Halperin (an early effort for him) under his Victory Pictures banner and released by the Vitagraph Company of America, soon to become part of Warner Bros. This is the last silent film of star Elsie Ferguson.

Cast
Elsie Ferguson as Elaine Kent
Frank Mayo as Kenneth Billings
Mildred Harris as Gale Norman
Peggy Kelly as Gladys
Leslie Austin as Fred Wagner
 Josephine Norman

Preservation
With no prints of The Unknown Lover located in any film archives, it is a lost film

References

External links

Still of Elsie Ferguson (University of Washington Sayre collection)
Lobby card
Lobby card at gettyimages.com

1925 films
American silent feature films
Lost American films
Films directed by Victor Halperin
Vitagraph Studios films
1925 drama films
1925 lost films
Silent American drama films
American black-and-white films
Lost drama films
1920s American films